The term man (from Proto-Germanic *mann- "person") and words derived from it can designate any or even all of the human race regardless of their sex or age. In traditional usage, man (without an article) itself refers to the species or to humanity (mankind) as a whole.

The Germanic word developed into Old English mann. In Old English, the word still primarily meant "person" or "human," and was used for men, women, and children alike. The sense "adult male" was very rare, at least in the written language. That meaning is not recorded at all until about the year 1000, over a hundred years after the writings of Alfred the Great and perhaps nearly three centuries after Beowulf.

Adopting the term for humans in general to refer to men is a common development of  Romance and Germanic languages, but  is not found in most other European languages (Slavic čelověkъ vs. mǫžь, Greek ἄνθρωπος vs. άνδρας, Finnish ihminen vs. mies   etc.).

Etymology
According to one etymology, Proto-Germanic *man-n- is derived from a Proto-Indo-European root *man-, *mon- or *men- (see Sanskrit/Avestan manu-, Slavic mǫž "man, male"). The Slavic forms (Russian muzh "man, male" etc.) are derived from a suffixed stem *man-gyo-.

In Hindu mythology, Manu is the name of the traditional progenitor of humankind who survives a deluge and gives mankind laws. The hypothetically reconstructed Proto-Indo-European form *Manus may also have played a role in Proto-Indo-European religion based on this, if there is any connection with the figure of Mannus — reported by the Roman historian Tacitus in ca. AD 70 to be the name of a traditional ancestor of the Germanic peoples and son of Tuisto; modern sources other than Tacitus have reinterpreted this as "first man".

Both  and  may be used to qualify "man"; for example:

These terms are also used to qualify compounds;  (variant ) developed into the modern word "woman".  also meant "male", and was used to qualify "man":  (variant , "male person"). There was also the term wæpenwifestre, meaning either an armed woman, or a woman with a penis. The Old English wer may survive today in the compound "werewolf" (from Old English werwulf, literally "man-wolf"). See wer.

Some etymologies treat the root as an independent one, as does the American Heritage Dictionary. Of the etymologies that do make connections with other Indo-European roots, man "the thinker" is the most traditional — that is, the word is connected with the root * "to think" (cognate to mind). This etymology relies on humans describing themselves as "those who think" (see Human self-reflection). This etymology, however, is not generally accepted. A second potential etymology connects with Latin  ("hand"), which has the same form as Sanskrit manus.

Another etymology postulates the reduction of the ancestor of "human" to the ancestor of "man". Human is from *, "earth", thus implying * would be an "earthdweller". The latter word, when reduced to just its final syllable, would be merely *m-on-. This is the view of Eric Partridge, Origins, under man. Such a derivation might be credible if only the Germanic form was known, but the attested Indo-Iranian manu virtually excludes the possibility. However, there may have been a single lexeme whose paradigm eventually split into two distinct lexemes in Proto-Germanic. Moreover, according to Brugmann's law, Sanskrit mánu, with its short a, implies a PIE reconstruction *menu- rather than *monu-, which would lead to an expected but not attested cognate **minn- in Proto-Germanic.

In the late twentieth century, the generic meaning of "man" declined (but is also continued in compounds "mankind", "everyman", "no-man", etc.). The same thing has happened to the Latin word : in most of the Romance languages,  have come to refer mainly to males, with a residual generic meaning. The exception is Romanian, where  refers to a 'human', vs.  (male).

The inflected forms of Old English  are:

The inflected forms of Old High German word for man (without i-mutation) are:

The inflected forms of the Old Norse word for man, maðr, are:

Modern usage

The word "man" is still used in its generic meaning in literary English.
 
The verb to man (i.e. "to furnish [a fortress or a ship] with a company of men") dates to early Middle English.

The word has been applied generally as a suffix in modern combinations like "fireman", "policeman" and "mailman". With social changes in the later 20th century, new gender-neutral terms were coined, such as "firefighter", "police officer" and "mail carrier", to redress the gender-specific connotations of occupational names. Social theorists argued that the confusion of man as human and man as male were linguistic symptoms of male-centric definitions of humanity.

In US American slang, man! also came to be used as an interjection, not necessarily addressing the listener but simply added for emphasis, much like boy!, and similarly, dude!

Also, in American English, the expression "The Man", referring to "the oppressive powers that be", originated in the Southern United States in the 20th century, and became widespread in the urban underworld from the 1950s.

Use of man- as a prefix and in composition usually denotes the generic meaning of "human", as in mankind,  man-eating, man-made, etc. In some instances, when modifying gender-neutral nouns, the prefix may also denote masculine gender, as in manservant (17th century). In the context of the culture war of the 2000s to 2010s, man was introduced as a derogatory prefix in feminist jargon in some instances,  in neologisms such as mansplaining (2008) manspreading (2014), etc.

See also

Were
Names for the human species
Last man
Gender neutrality in English
Manu and Yemo

References

English words
Etymologies
Interjections
Humans